Sandra Lee may refer to:

 Sandra Lee (chef), American television chef, author and former first lady of New York
 Sandra Lee (dermatologist), a dermatologist who makes online videos as Dr. Pimple Popper
 Sandra Lee-Vercoe (née Lee), New Zealand politician
 Sandra Birch Lee, former Hong Kong politician
 Sandy Lee, lawyer and politician
 Sandra Lee, a character in the graphic novel Superman: Earth One